Joseph Biziyaremye (born 1 January 1988) is a Rwandan former cyclist.

Major results

2011
 1st Stage 8 Tour du Rwanda
2012
 3rd Overall Kwita Izina Cycling Tour
1st Stage 3
2013
 1st Stage 6 Tour of the Democratic Republic of Congo
2014
 4th Overall Tour du Rwanda
1st Stage 5
2015
 1st  Road race, National Road Championships
 7th Overall Tour du Rwanda
 10th Overall Tour de Côte d'Ivoire
 10th Overall Tour de Constantine
2016
 3rd Road race, National Road Championships

References

External links

 

1988 births
Living people
Rwandan male cyclists